A priory is a monastery of men or women under religious vows that is headed by a prior or prioress.  Priories may be houses of mendicant friars  or nuns (such as the Dominicans, Augustinians, Franciscans, and Carmelites), or monasteries of monks or nuns (as with the Benedictines). Houses of canons regular and canonesses regular also use this term, the alternative being "canonry".

In pre-Reformation England, if an abbey church was raised to cathedral status, the abbey became a cathedral priory. The bishop, in effect, took the place of the abbot, and the monastery itself was headed by a prior.

History
Priories first came to existence as subsidiaries to the Abbey of Cluny. Many new houses were formed that were all subservient to the abbey of Cluny and called Priories. As such, the priory came to represent the Benedictine ideals espoused by the Cluniac reforms as smaller, lesser houses of Benedictines of Cluny. There were likewise many conventual priories in Germany and Italy during the Middle Ages, and in England all monasteries attached to cathedral churches were known as cathedral priories.

The Benedictines and their offshoots (Cistercians and Trappists among them), the Premonstratensians, and the military orders distinguish between conventual and simple or obedientiary priories.

Conventual priories are those autonomous houses that have no abbots, either because the canonically required number of twelve monks has not yet been reached, or for some other reason. 
Simple or obedientiary priories are dependencies of abbeys. Their superior, who is subject to the abbot in everything, is called a simple or obedientiary prior. These monasteries are satellites of the mother abbey. The Cluniac order is notable for being organised entirely on this obedientiary principle, with a single abbot at the Abbey of Cluny, and all other houses dependent priories.

Priory is also used to refer to the geographic headquarters of several commanderies of knights.

Sources and references

External links 
 

Christian monasteries

pl:Klasztor